Lomita (Spanish for "Little hill") is a city in Los Angeles County, California, United States. The population was 20,921 at the 2020 census, up from 20,256 at the 2010 census.

History

The Spanish Empire had expanded into this area when the Viceroy of New Spain commissioned Juan Rodríguez Cabrillo to explore the Pacific Ocean in 1542–1543. In 1767, the area became part of the Province of the Californias.

The rancho changed in size over the years, as Domínguez's descendants partitioned the land amongst family members, sold parcels to newly arriving settlers, or relinquished some when validating their legal claim with the Mexican government in 1828, and with the United States government in 1858. The Domínguez family name is still applied throughout the area, including the Dominguez Rancho Adobe historical landmark, in the unincorporated community of Rancho Dominguez, located northeast of Lomita.

Lomita was incorporated as a city on June 30, 1964, to prevent further annexation by neighboring cities and in an attempt to curtail the development of high-rise apartment buildings.

Lomita established a sister city relationship with Takaishi, Osaka, Japan, in October 1981.

Geography

Lomita originally spanned . However, over time, much of this area was annexed by neighboring cities. A notable example is "Lomita Fields", now Zamperini Field (the Torrance Municipal Airport).

Climate
According to the Köppen Climate Classification system, Lomita has a semi-arid climate, abbreviated "BSk" on climate maps.

Demographics

2010
At the 2010 census Lomita had a population of 20,256. The racial makeup of Lomita was 11,987 (59.2%) White (43.4% Non-Hispanic White), 1,075 (5.3%) African American, 174 (0.9%) Native American, 2,923 (14.4%) Asian, 140 (0.7%) Pacific Islander, 2,680 (13.2%) from other races, and 1,277 (6.3%) from two or more races. Hispanic or Latino of any race were 6,652 persons (32.8%).

The census reported that 20,089 people (99.2% of the population) lived in households, 57 (0.3%) lived in non-institutionalized group quarters, and 110 (0.5%) were institutionalized.

There were 8,068 households, 2,479 (30.7%) had children under the age of 18 living in them, 3,409 (42.3%) were opposite-sex married couples living together, 1,160 (14.4%) had a female householder with no husband present, 481 (6.0%) had a male householder with no wife present.  There were 491 (6.1%) unmarried opposite-sex partnerships, and 55 (0.7%) same-sex married couples or partnerships. 2,420 households (30.0%) were one person and 822 (10.2%) had someone living alone who was 65 or older. The average household size was 2.49.  There were 5,050 families (62.6% of households); the average family size was 3.12.

The age distribution was 4,378 people (21.6%) under the age of 18, 1,743 people (8.6%) aged 18 to 24, 5,699 people (28.1%) aged 25 to 44, 5,904 people (29.1%) aged 45 to 64, and 2,532 people (12.5%) who were 65 or older.  The median age was 39.6 years. For every 100 females, there were 93.3 males.  For every 100 females age 18 and over, there were 89.8 males.

There were 8,412 housing units at an average density of 4,402.5 per square mile, of the occupied units 3,738 (46.3%) were owner-occupied and 4,330 (53.7%) were rented. The homeowner vacancy rate was 0.7%; the rental vacancy rate was 3.4%.  9,183 people (45.3% of the population) lived in owner-occupied housing units and 10,906 people (53.8%) lived in rental housing units.

According to the 2010 United States Census, Lomita had a median household income of $60,398, with 12.2% of the population living below the federal poverty line.

2000
At the 2000 census there were 20,046 people in 8,015 households, including 5,033 families, in the city. The population density was 10,572.7 inhabitants per square mile (4,073.6/km2). The racial makeup of the city was 66.16% White, 4.18% African American, 0.70% Native American, 11.41% Asian, 0.52% Pacific Islander, 10.79% from other races, and 6.23% from two or more races. Hispanic or Latino of any race were 26.20%.

Of the 8,015 households 32.9% had children under the age of 18 living with them, 43.0% were married couples living together, 14.5% had a female householder with no husband present, and 37.2% were non-families. 30.6% of households were one person and 9.3% were one person aged 65 or older.  The average household size was 2.48 and the average family size was 3.13.

The age distribution was 25.5% under the age of 18, 7.6% from 18 to 24, 34.2% from 25 to 44, 21.9% from 45 to 64, and 10.9% 65 or older.  The median age was 36 years. For every 100 females, there were 92.2 males.  For every 100 females age 18 and over, there were 87.8 males.

The median household income was $51,360 and the median family income  was $53,003. Males had a median income of $41,582 versus $31,353 for females. The per capita income for the city was $27,748.  About 9.3% of families and 11.1% of the population were below the poverty line, including 15.3% of those under age 18 and 11.0% of those age 65 or over.

Government and infrastructure
Fire protection in Lomita is provided by the Los Angeles County Fire Department with ambulance transport by McCormick Ambulance.

The Los Angeles County Sheriff's Department (LASD) operates the Lomita Station in Lomita.

The Los Angeles County Department of Health Services operates the Torrance Health Center in Harbor Gateway, Los Angeles, near Torrance and serving Lomita.

The United States Postal Service Lomita Post Office is located at 25131 Narbonne Avenue.

Politics

The city of Lomita supported the Republican candidates for president in 1984 and 1988, but has since become a predominantly Democratic city in more recent years.
The city of Lomita has supported the Democratic candidate in the past seven consecutive presidential elections. In the eight presidential elections since 1988, the percentage of the vote received by the Democrat has increased from the previous election.

Landmarks 

 Lomita Railroad Museum, opened in 1966 by Irene Lewis, is a small museum in Lomita devoted to the steam-engine period of railroading. Mrs. Lewis, along with her husband Martin, operated "Little Engines of Lomita", which sold kits for live steam-engine locomotives. Her engines also appeared in movies, including "The Greatest Show on Earth" (1952) and "Von Ryans Express" (1965). This operation inspired Mrs. Lewis to earn a mechanical engineering degree late in life and to build the museum as a showplace for her products. When built, the museum was the first of its kind West of Denver. The museum was designed to replicate the Boston & Maine's Greenwood Station in Wakefield, Massachusetts. The Museum was donated by Mrs. Lewis to the City of Lomita in honor of her late husband, Martin Lewis, in 1967. On display are a 1902 Baldwin Locomotive, a Southern Pacific tender, a 1910 Union Pacific caboose, and a Santa Fe caboose. The Museum also houses a full-size replica of a 1920s water tower that was constructed in 2000. The museum also incorporates a small public park, which accommodates a Union Pacific boxcar and a Union Oil tank car. The Museum is open Thursday through Sunday. Mrs. Lewis's little engines were featured on a Lawrence Welk show saluting senior citizens. Mary Lou Metzger operated the train, and a song about railroading.
 5 Star Comics, Comic store owned by professional wrestler Rob Van Dam. He moved the store from Lakewood to Lomita. (Now closed)

Education
Lomita residents are within the Los Angeles Unified School District (LAUSD). The area is within Board District 7. As of 2008 Dr. Richard Vladovic represents the district.

Elementary schools that serve Lomita include:
 Eshelman Avenue Elementary School
 Lomita Math/Science Magnet (Kindergarten zoned only - 1-5 is magnet only)
 President Avenue Elementary School (1-5) (in Los Angeles)

For a two-year period prior to 1991 Lomita attempted to secede from the LAUSD, but by that year abandoned its efforts.

Nishiyamato Academy of California, a Japanese elementary and junior high school, is located in Lomita. The school opened in April 1993; at the time it was located in Rolling Hills Estates. It was founded by Ryotaro Tanose, a former Japanese Diet member, as a sister school of the Nishiyamato Gakuen Junior and Senior High School (Nishiyamato Academy) in Kawai, Nara Prefecture, Japan.

Notable people

Ted Lilly, Los Angeles Dodgers pitcher
Nikki Hornsby, musician
Deane McMinn, figure skating judge and USFS team manager, killed in the crash of Sabena Flight 548
Erv Palica, Major league pitcher, born to Montenegrin Serb parents
Chad Qualls, Colorado Rockies pitcher
Jim Thorpe, Native American athlete
Edward O. Thorp, mathematics professor, author, hedge fund manager, and blackjack player
Milo Aukerman, Punk rock

References

External links

 
Cities in Los Angeles County, California
South Bay, Los Angeles
Populated places established in 1964
1964 establishments in California
Incorporated cities and towns in California